Wimer is an unincorporated community and census-designated place (CDP) in Jackson County, Oregon, United States. As of the 2010 census it had a population of 678. Wimer lies along Evans Creek north of the city of Rogue River.

The community was named for a relative of William Wimer, who edited a newspaper in Grants Pass in 1886–87. William Wimer was also said to have helped establish a post office in Wimer, which remained open until 1909. Simon E. Simpkins was the first postmaster.

Wimer Bridge is a covered bridge that crosses Evans Creek in Wimer. It replaced a 1927 version of the bridge that collapsed into the creek in 2003. In 2008, with the help of federal funds and local labor, the bridge was replaced with a look-alike using stronger materials. This version of the bridge opened to traffic in February 2008.

Demographics

References

Unincorporated communities in Jackson County, Oregon
Census-designated places in Oregon
Unincorporated communities in Oregon
Census-designated places in Jackson County, Oregon